A183 may refer to:
 A183 road (England), a road connecting South Shields, Tyne and Wear and Chester-le-Street, County Durham
 A183 road (Malaysia), a road in Perak